Sant'Ambrogio  is a Roman Catholic church in Florence, region of Tuscany, Italy.  It is named in honour of St Ambrose.

History
Allegedly built where Saint Ambrose would have stayed when in Florence in 393, the church is first recorded in 998, but is probably older. The church was rebuilt by Giovanni Battista Foggini in the 17th century.

A legend says that on 30 December 1230 a chalice which had not been cleaned was, the next day, found to contain blood rather than wine by Uguccione, the parish priest. This Eucharistic miracle made the church a place of pilgrimage.

Francesco Granacci (1469–1543), an Italian painter of the Renaissance and lifelong friend of Michelangelo Buonarroti, is buried in this church.

Art
The church contains numerous frescos, altarpieces, and other artwork attributed to Andrea Orcagna, Agnolo Gaddi, Niccolò Gerini, Lorenzo di Bicci, Masaccio, Filippo Lippi, Sandro Botticelli, Alesso Baldovinetti, Fra Bartolomeo, and Leonardo Tassini.

A marble altar in the Chapel of the Misericordia was designed by Mino da Fiesole; the same chapel has a fresco (1476) depicting events surrounding the miracle of the cup of wine by Cosimo Roselli.

Filippo Lippi's Incoronation of the Virgin, executed for the church's main altar in 1441–1447, is now at the Uffizi.

Sources

External links

Ambrogio
8th-century churches in Italy
17th-century Roman Catholic church buildings in Italy